Hristiana Todorova (born 28 November 1994) is a Bulgarian politician and former group rhythmic gymnast.

Career 
Todorova represented her nation at international competitions. She participated at the 2012 Summer Olympics. She also competed at world championships, including at the 2015 World Rhythmic Gymnastics Championships where she won a silver and bronze medal.

Todorova was member of the Bulgarian group that competed at the 2016 Summer Olympics in Rio de Janeiro, Brazil. (Together with Lyubomira Kazanova, Mihaela Maevska, Tsvetelina Naydenova, Reneta Kamberova), they won the Group All-around bronze medal. They dedicated their medal to their teammate Tsvetelina Stoyanova, who had attempted to commit suicide and fell from her apartment in Sofia.

She completed her career after the Olympic Games.

Detailed Olympic results

Politics 
Todorova has since 2021 served as a deputy in the National Parliament from the ITN party.

References

External links
 
 
 

1994 births
Living people
Gymnasts from Sofia
Bulgarian rhythmic gymnasts
Gymnasts at the 2012 Summer Olympics
Gymnasts at the 2016 Summer Olympics
Olympic gymnasts of Bulgaria
Gymnasts at the 2015 European Games
European Games competitors for Bulgaria
Medalists at the Rhythmic Gymnastics European Championships
Medalists at the Rhythmic Gymnastics World Championships
Olympic bronze medalists for Bulgaria
Medalists at the 2016 Summer Olympics
Olympic medalists in gymnastics
Bulgarian politicians